Olu Akengbuwa was the 16th Olu of Warri who ruled over the Kingdom of Warri. He succeeded his father Olu Erejuwa I as the 16th Olu of Warri. He took the title, Ogiame Akengbuwa. He was also called Eyeolusan Joao. When he went to be with his fathers, there was a period of crisis following the death to the potential successors which was followed by a period of political Interregnum. His son Prince Oritsemone left Ode-Itsekiri during the period of the crisis to form Usele Community.

References

Nigerian traditional rulers
People from Warri
Year of birth unknown
Year of death unknown